The Prorogation Act 1867 (30 & 31 Vict. c.81) is an Act of the Parliament of the United Kingdom which is still in force in the United Kingdom with amendments.

It was passed to simplify the forms of prorogation during a recess of Parliament. Prorogation is the period from the formal end of a parliamentary session to the opening of the next session. The Act allowed the period of a prorogation to be extended to a day at least 14 days later.

See also
 Meeting of Parliament Act 1797
 Succession to the Crown Act 1707

References

External links
 Hansard, second reading in House of Lords
 Prorogation, UK Parliament

United Kingdom Acts of Parliament 1867